Martin Okelo Djetou (born 15 December 1974) is a French former footballer who played as a defender.

Club career
Djetou was born in Brogohlo, in the Ivory Coast. His clubs included Strasbourg, Monaco, Parma, Fulham, Nice, Bolton Wanderers and Istres and SC Schiltigheim. At Monaco he was part of the squad that won Ligue 1 in 1997 and 2000.

Djetou made his name as a powerful defensive midfielder for Monaco, most notably dominating a Champions League quarter final against Manchester United in 1998. Following that game Djetou - who also played in defence - was linked with a host of top European clubs, but chose Parma as his next destination.

Prior to his brief spell at Bolton, his only other experience in English football came by the way of a two-year loan spell at Fulham where he amassed over half a century of appearances (and scored the winner against Leeds United in a 1–0 win in December 2002) but a permanent deal could not be agreed with Italian club Parma.

In November 2006 he was awarded a trial at English club Leeds United but was not offered a permanent deal. After his spell with Bolton, he moved back to France, joining up with Istres. However, after some sluggish performances, he was released from his contract in 2006.

In 2007, he stopped his professional career, started to play for SC Schiltigheim (amateur) and retired in summer 2008.

International career
The Ivorian-born Djetou won full international honours with France, the country in which he grew up. He played on the French team at the 1996 Summer Olympics. He was in France's preliminary squad of 28 players for the 1998 FIFA World Cup on home soil, but was one of six players dropped by head coach Aime Jacquet in the final cut prior to the start of the tournament. France went on to be victorious in the tournament and become national heroes.

Personal life
In 2007, Djetou opened a beauty parlour, in the town of Illkirch (Espace Djétou).

Honours 

Strasbourg
UEFA Intertoto Cup: 1995

Monaco
Ligue 1: 1996–97
Ligue 1: 1999–2000
Trophée des Champions: 2000

Parma
Coppa Italia: 2001–02

References

External links
 Martin Djetou career profile
 

1974 births
Living people
French footballers
French sportspeople of Ivorian descent
France under-21 international footballers
France international footballers
RC Strasbourg Alsace players
AS Monaco FC players
Parma Calcio 1913 players
Fulham F.C. players
OGC Nice players
Bolton Wanderers F.C. players
FC Istres players
Ivorian emigrants to France
Ligue 1 players
Serie A players
Premier League players
Footballers at the 1996 Summer Olympics
Olympic footballers of France
French expatriate footballers
Expatriate footballers in England
Expatriate footballers in Italy
French expatriate sportspeople in England
French expatriate sportspeople in Italy
Association football defenders